Aleksandr Gennadyevich Krupoder (born 20 January 1992) is a Russian professional football player.

Club career
He made his Russian Football National League debut for FC Petrotrest Saint Petersburg on 17 July 2012 in a game against FC Tom Tomsk.

External links
 

1992 births
Living people
Russian footballers
Association football forwards
FC Petrotrest players
FC Bashinformsvyaz-Dynamo Ufa players
FC Spartak Kostroma players
FC Strogino Moscow players
FC Veles Moscow players